Thomas Zipp (born 1966, Heppenheim, Germany) is an artist based in Berlin.

Education
Zipp studied at the Städelschule, Frankfurt (with Thomas Bayrle) and the Slade School, London from 1992–1998.

Work

Art
With a palette that favors burnt umber, gray and army green, his dark thinly painted canvases and sculptures often come in a careworn palette of ash white, granite grey and much black. The paintings' stretchers sometimes extend into legs that might allow them to be carried like banners; some are paired with separately framed photo-based images of bearded 19th-century father figures or skeletons that seem to comment on the paintings. In his 2008 show "White Dada" at London's Alison Jacques Gallery, Dada-style montages and defaced pictures included a textbook description of electroconvulsive therapy and images of drugs of the medical, non-recreational kind.

Music
In music, Zipp teamed up with Felix Weber to produce "Freie Musik" in 2002, first called Nazihipiwelt. They formed a trio called ZLW-Trio with electronic artist Sepp Löbert. Next Zipp and Weber founded the band DA ("Dickarsch", meaning fatass in English) in 2006. The band featured Stefan Branca on guitar, as well as Phillip Zaiser and Kai Erdmann. DA released the LP Nach Hause in 2007. The opening nights of Zipp's exhibitions often feature musical performances by the artist and his band.

Teaching
Since 2008, Zipp has been a professor at the Berlin University of the Arts.

Exhibitions
Zipp's work has been shown work in many exhibitions including “Artforum Berlin” , at Thread Waxing Space in New York City and at Stadtische Galerie Wolfsburg . Zipp has also shown at galleries and museums such as Tate Modern, London, Transmission Gallery, Glasgow and OTTO, Copenhagen.

He is represented by Galerie Guido W Baudach  in Berlin; Alison Jacques Gallery in London; Patricia Low Contemporary  in Gstaad; Harris Lieberman  in New York; and Patrick Painter  and China Art Objects Galleries in Los Angeles.

Solo exhibitions (selection) 

2013
Comparative Investigation about the Disposition of the Width of a Circle, 55th International Art Exhibition, La Biennale di Venezia (cat.)
The Pink Noise Diaries, Kaufmann Repetto, Milan
The chips are down, Harris Lieberman Gallery, New York

2012
England Attacked By The Americas, Kunstverein Oldenburg
Blackout Chambers, L'Arc de Cercle & Dissociative Amnesia, Galerie Guido W. Baudach, Berlin
3 contributions to the theory of mass-aberrations in modern religions, Alison Jaques Gallery, London

2011
Beyond the Superego, Galerie Krinziger, Vienna
Achtung!: solarized deterritorialization. insanity against Protestantism (England attacked by the Americas),
Ausstellungsraum Céline und Heiner Bastian, Berlin (cat.)
bilobed flaps, Baronian_Francey, Brussels
The World´s most complete Congress of Ritatin Treatments, Kunstraum Innsbruck, Innsbruck (cat.)
The forbidden Conduct (Deviations in conservative societies), Sommer Contemporary Art, Tel Aviv

2010

(White Reformation Co-op) Mens Sana in Corpore Sano, Kunsthalle Fridericianum, Kassel (cat.)

2009

Faces, Kunstverein Heppenheim, Heppenheim
The World’s Most Complete Congress Of Strange People, Galerie Guido W. Baudach, Berlin
Mens Agitat Molem (Luther & The Family of Pills), Sammlung Goetz, Munich (cat.)

2008

White Dada, Alison Jacques Gallery, London
Black Pattex 78, Galería Heinrich Ehrhardt, Madrid (cat.)
Planet Caravan? Is There Life After Death? a Futuristic World Fair, Museum Dhondt-Daehnens, Deurle / Belgium
S.S.B.S.M. (sick souls by sick minds), Galerie Guido W. Baudach, Berlin

2007

Planet Caravan? Is There Life After Death? a Futuristic World Fair, South London Gallery, London (cat.)
Planet Caravan? Is There Life After Death? a Futuristic World Fair, Kunsthalle Mannheim, Mannheim / Museum in der Alten Post, Mülheim (cat.)
The Family of Ornament and Verbrechen, Galerie Krinzinger, Vienna

2006

Hier (Futuristic Mess), Galerie Rüdiger Schöttle, Munich
Geist über Materie, Patrick Painter Inc., Santa Monica
Uranlicht, Harris Lieberman Gallery, New York
(God bless the (Lord Auch)), Galerie Guido W. Baudach, Berlin

2005

Dirty Tree Black Pills, Oldenburger Kunstverein, Oldenburg (cat.)
man muss das adjektiv abschaffen, Baronian_Francey, Brussels

2004

Futurism Now! Samoa leads, Daniel Hug Gallery, Los Angeles
The New Breed, Part 1 (Geist Ohne Körper), Galerie Michael Neff, Frankfurt/M. (cat.)
The New Breed, Part 2 (Geist Ohne Körper), Galerie Parisa Kind, Frankfurt/M. (cat.)

2003

Neroin, Galerie Guido W. Baudach, Berlin (cat.)
The Nero Command, Marc Jancou Fine Art, New York

2001

Exorcise the demons of perhaps, Maschenmode, Galerie Guido W. Baudach, Berlin
Atrium Vagari (with Phillip Zaiser), Kunsthaus Essen, Essen

2000

OD, Maschenmode, Galerie Guido W. Baudach, Berlin

Group exhibitions (selection) 

2008

Vertrautes Terrain – Aktuelle Kunst in & über Deutschland, ZKM, Karlsruhe (cat.)

Back to Black – Schwarz in der aktuellen Malerei, kestnergesellschaft, Hannover (cat.)
	
2007

Euro-Centric. Part 1, Rubell Family Collection, Miami (cat.)

Sympathy for the Devil: Art and Rock and Roll Since 1967, Museum of Contemporary Art Chicago / Museum of Contemporary Art, Miami / Museum of Contemporary Art, Montreal (cat.)

Perspektive07, Städtische Galerie im Lenbachhaus, München

Mystic Truths, Auckland Art Gallery, Auckland / Neuseeland (cat.)

Made in Germany, kestnergesellschaft, Hannover (cat.)

Kunstpreis der Böttcherstraße in Bremen 2007, Kunsthalle Bremen (cat.)

2006	

Deformation of Character, PS.1, New York

Rings of Saturn, Tate Modern, London

Von Mäusen und Menschen, 4th Berlin Biennale, Berlin (cat.)

2005	

When Humour Becomes Painful, Migrosmuseum für Gegenwartskunst, Zürich (cat.)

2003	

actionbutton, Hamburger Bahnhof / Museum für Gegenwart, Berlin (cat.)

Publications (selections) 
Achtung! Vision: Samoa, the family of pills & the return of the subreals, Hatje Cantz, Ostfildern-Ruit 2005, Ed. Guido W. Baudach
Planet Caravan? is there life after death? a futuristic world fair, Kerber, Bielefeld/Leipzig 2007, .
Mens agitat molem : Thomas Zipp; Luther & The Family of Pills, Kunstverlag Goetz, München 2009, Ed. Guido W. Baudach
Thomas Zipp, (white reformation co-op) mens sana in corpore sano, Verlag der Buchhandlung Walther König, Cologne 2010, Ed. Rein Wolfs und Guido W. Baudach

References

External links
artnet.de
Artfacts.net
kunstaspekte.de
Guido W. Baudach
Patricia Low Contemporary
Kunsthalle Fridericianum, Kasel
Sommer Contemporary Art
Saatchi Gallery
Patrick Painter
Alison Jacques Gallery
Art in Review; Thomas Zipp, New York Times, June 2, 2006
Berliner Poster Verlag

German artists
1966 births
Living people
Städelschule alumni